Sula is a Malayo-Polynesian language of the Central Maluku branch.

Phonology

Consonants 

Voiced consonant sounds  may also be heard as devoiced  in word-final position.

Vowels 

References

Further reading

 

Central Maluku languages
Languages of the Maluku Islands